Northlink College is a Government higher education institution situated in Bellville, Western Cape, South Africa. It is fully accredited by the Council on Higher Education and Department of Higher Education and Training (DoHET)(South Africa). The College is quality assured by the South African Council on Higher Education (CHE).

History 

It was founded in 2002, after a South African Government decision to merge four colleges Wingfield Technical College, Tygerberg  College, Bellville Technical College and Belhar College

Name 

It's called Northlink due to it being situated in the Northern Suburbs of Cape Town, and through its campuses links them together.

Campuses 

Apart from the main campus on Voortrekker Road in Bellville it has campuses in 
Belhar, Goodwood, Parow, Protea, Tygerberg and Wingfield

Courses 

Northlink College offers undergraduate tertiary qualifications. The college is also involved in partnership with organizations

Student numbers 

2015 numbers exceed 10 000.

Principal 

Leon Beeck is heading the college.

Alumni 

Theodore Jantjies, actor

References 

Educational institutions established in 2002
Colleges in South Africa
2002 establishments in South Africa